Reserved powers, residual powers, or residuary powers are the powers that are neither prohibited nor explicitly given by law to any organ of government. Such powers, as well as general power of competence, are given because it is impractical to detail in legislation every act allowed to be carried out by the state.

By country

Common law countries 
The United Kingdom and countries whose legal system is based on common law, such as Canada, India, Israel, and Ireland, have similar legal frameworks of reserved powers.

Australia 
In Australia, despite the centralized nature of the constitution, the High Court adopted the "reserved powers doctrine" which was used until 1920 to preserved as much autonomy for the states as can be interpreted from the constitution. This practice changed with the Engineers' Case which led reserved powers to be given to the Commonwealth.

Canada 
In Canada the reserved powers lie with the federal government.

United States 
In the United States, the Tenth Amendment of the Constitution states that any power not explicitly granted to the federal government lies solely in the states. However, since World War II, the Supreme Court has consistently ruled against cases challenging the powers of Congress, with exceptions during the Rehnquist Court. In effect, the Supreme Court has decided that Congress has the power to determine the scope of its own authority.

See also 
 Dillon's Rule
 Everything which is not forbidden is allowed
 Principle of conferral of the European Union
 Power of the purse

References 

Federalism
Constitutions